Jacob van Eyck (26 March 1657) was a Dutch nobleman and blind musician. He was one of the best-known musicians of the Dutch Golden Age, working as a carillon player and technician, an organist, a recorder virtuoso, and a composer. He was an expert in bell casting and tuning, and taught Pieter and François Hemony how to tune a carillon. Van Eyck is credited with developing the modern carillon together with the brothers in 1644, when they cast the first tuned carillon in Zutphen. He is also known for his collection of 143 melodies for recorder, the largest work for a solo wind instrument in European history.

Biography

Early life
Jacob van Eyck was born in 1589 or 1590 into a noble family probably in the small town of Heusden. Born blind, he lived with his mother and father well into adulthood. Van Eyck became involved as a player and technician of village's carillon by 1619. He met with several craftsmen and the city organist to discuss changes and improvements to the carillon, which he carried out in 1620 and 1621.

Carillon career
Van Eyck quickly established himself as a renowned carillon player and technician. In 1623 and 1624, he was employed by the city of Utrecht to repair and renovate the Dom Tower's clock and carillon. A year later, after negotiations with the city, he left home to become the city carillonneur. His title was changed to "Director of the Bell-Works" in 1628, and he was entrusted with the technical supervision of all the bells of the city. He began instructing students to learn to play the carillon. In 1631, he had a small keyboard composed of 30 small bells constructed for instruction.

Campanology career

Van Eyck belonged to a circle of academics who met and corresponded regularly to exchange ideas. One of these was Marin Mersenne, who was the first to codify the harmonics of a vibrating spring. Van Eyck applied Mersenne's research to the acoustics of tuned bells. He devised methods for isolating the partials of a bell by whistling at the partials' resonant frequencies. Van Eyck showcased his discovery to mathematician René Descartes, who on 23 August 1638, wrote to Mersenne: "In Utrecht lives a blind man with a great musical reputation, who regularly plays bells (...). I have seen how he elicits 5 or 6 different sounds on each of the largest bells, without touching them, but only by coming close to their sound rim with his mouth..." In 1633, Van Eyck told Isaac Beeckman that the ideal series of a bell's partials consisted of three notes each an octave apart, supplemented by a minor third and perfect fifth in the second octave, and he convinced Beeckman to write about it in his journal on 24 September. The minor overtone series causes the characteristic melancholy sound of a well-tuned carillon.

Not only could they could be isolated, but Van Eyck asserted that they could be tuned harmoniously with each other by altering the shape of the bell itself. He claimed that it is not possible for a bell to be properly tuned upon casting, but instead that adjustments needed to be made to tune it. His assertion was put to the test in 1644. The city of Zutphen commissioned the famous bellfounding duo Pieter and François Hemony to cast a new carillon for its Wijnhuis tower. The city appointed Van Eyck as its consultant. He convinced the Hemony brothers to tune their carillon bells according to his research before finishing the job, rather than waiting for a negative review from the city. To achieve this, François cast the carillon bells slightly too thick so that they could be shaved down while tuning. Where other bellfounders haphazardly shaved the inside of a bell in an attempt to fix its tune, François placed them on a lathe rotated by five or six men to guarantee symmetry. He then shaved down the insides with a chisel to tune the five principal tones. Hemony carillons outfitted with "pure" tuned bells quickly became the standard and were coveted across Europe for decades. Van Eyck's acquaintance with the intellectuals of the time along with his longstanding relationship with bellfounders helps explain how he was able to influence the Hemony brothers.

Recorder career
In addition to his work with the carillon, Van Eyck was a particularly skillful recorder player. In 1644 in Antwerp, Paulus Matthysz published Van Eyck's , a collection of variations on popular folk songs at the time for recorder. A subsequent volume was published in 1646 and a revised and greatly enlarged version of first volume was published in 1649. Probably in response to the success of the works, Sint Janskerk increased the salary paid to Van Eyck provided that he entertain passers-by with songs on his recorder.

Later life and death

The final years of Van Eyck's life were spent in declining health. He died on 26 March 1657 in Utrecht. His assistant and caretaker Johan Dicx was the principal legatee of his will and succeeded him in most of his carillonneur positions. He was buried the next day, and for three hours, the bells of Sint Janskerk, the Jacobikerk, and the Dom Tower were tolled in his memory. Lambertus Sanderus composed a four-line verse that is inscribed on Van Eyck's gravestone. In 2006, the mayor of Utrecht unveiled an inlaid memorial tablet in the Dom Square, at an angle to Dom Tower. The Utrecht Bellringers Guild awards the Jacob van Eyck Prize every three years to fund the preservation of Dutch cultural and historical heritage and campanological research.

Works

Van Eyck's sole published work, is an extensive collection 143 melodies, each with a number of diminutions or variations for solo soprano recorder. The themes include folk songs, dance tunes, church music, psalms, and songs of the day, as well as a few compositions by Van Eyck. Some of the best known include a variation on John Dowland's "Flow, my tears" and a favorite Christmas carol at the time, "Unto Us Is Born a Son". Some of the variations are considered challenging even for an experienced recorder player.  remains the largest work for a solo wind instrument in European history; it is also the only work of this magnitude to have been dictated rather than written down by the composer.

Notes

References

Bibliography

Books

Internet

External links
 Music by Jacob Van Eyck
 

1590s births
1657 deaths
17th-century classical composers
Blind classical musicians
Campanologists
Carillon makers
Carillonneurs
Dutch Baroque composers
Dutch blind people
Dutch classical composers
Dutch classical musicians
Dutch male classical composers
Dutch recorder players
Jonkheers of the Netherlands
People from Heusden
Musicians from Utrecht (city)
Recorder players
Year of birth uncertain
17th-century male musicians